Karolina Ratajska née Podgórska (born 21 July 1987) is a professional Polish women's darts player currently plays in World Darts Federation (WDF). She is a four-time Polish Women's Champion and first and only Polish women's darts player qualified for BDO World Darts Championship.

Career
In 2018, she qualified for the 2019 BDO World Darts Championship as a qualifier, where she played ten time champion Trina Gulliver in the first round, but lost by two sets to one.

World Championship results

BDO
 2019: First round (lost to Trina Gulliver 1-2)

Performance timeline

External links
 Karolina Podgórska's profile and stats on Darts Database

References

Living people
1987 births
Polish darts players
Female darts players